The Roman Catholic Archdiocese of Managua (erected 2 December 1913) is a metropolitan diocese, and its suffragan dioceses include Bluefields, Esteli, Granada, Jinotega, Juigalpa, León en Nicaragua and Matagalpa.

Bishops

Ordinaries
Archbishop José Antonio Lezcano y Ortega (1913–1952)
Archbishop Vicente Alejandro González y Robleto (1952–1968)
Cardinal Miguel Obando Bravo, S.D.B. (1970–2005)
Cardinal Leopoldo Brenes Solorzano (2005–present)

Coadjutor archbishop
Vicente Alejandro González y Robleto (1938-1952)

Auxiliary bishops
Isidro Carrillo y Salazar (1913-1924), appointed Bishop of Matagalpa
Carlos de la Trinidad Borge y Castrillo (1953-1968)
Donaldo Chávez Núñez (1966-1970)
César Bosco Vivas Robelo (1981-1991), appointed Bishop of León en Nicaragua
Leopoldo Brenes Solorzano (1988-1991), appointed Bishop of Matagalpa (but would later return here as Archbishop); future Cardinal
Juan Abelardo Mata Guevara, S.D.B. (1988-1990), appointed Bishop of Esteli
Jorge Solórzano Pérez (2000-2005), appointed Bishop of Matagalpa
Silvio José Báez Ortega, O.C.D. (2009-

Territorial losses

See also
Catholic Church in Nicaragua

References

External links
 

Roman Catholic dioceses in Nicaragua
Christian organizations established in 1913
Roman Catholic dioceses and prelatures established in the 20th century
1913 establishments in Nicaragua